Serlin Spur  is a narrow, mostly snow-covered spur 4 nautical miles (7 km) south of Bowyer Butte in Marie Byrd Land. The spur extends eastward from the divide between Johnson and Venzke Glaciers and intrudes into the upper part of the latter glacier. Mapped by United States Geological Survey (USGS) from surveys and U.S. Navy air photos, 1959–65. Named by Advisory Committee on Antarctic Names (US-ACAN) for Ronald C. Serlin, ionospheric physicist at Siple Station, 1969–70.

Ridges of Marie Byrd Land